Al-Seyassah (also transliterated Al-Siyasa) is a Kuwaiti daily newspaper published by Dar Al-Seyassah Press Publishing Printing and Distribution Co. The editor-in-chief of the newspaper is Ahmed Al-Jarallah.

History
Al-Seyassah was launched on 3 June 1965 as a weekly magazine by Ahmed Al-Jarallah and owned by Abdulaziz F. Al-Masaeed. In 1968, Al-Jarallah bought Al-Seyassah from Al-Masaeed with a bank loan and, with assistance from his friend the minister of information, obtained the license to turn the weekly magazine to a daily newspaper format.

Naji al-Ali worked for the paperfrom 1968 to 1974. In 1977, Jarallah expanded Al-Seyassah into a media group, which also publishes the English-language Arab Times newspaper and the weekly magazine Al-Hadaf in partnership with Syrian businessman Mazen Al-Tarazi.

In 1977, the assets of Al-Seyassah were estimated at more than five million Kuwaiti dinars ($17.25m) in 1977 values, including a printing plant which was at the time the most modern in the region.

In 2003, the newspaper held the 4th circulation ranking in Kuwait, with an adult readership of 302,700, a daily circulation of 75,679 copies, and a market share of 16.82%.

See also
List of newspapers in Kuwait

References

External links
 Official website

1965 establishments in Kuwait
Arabic-language newspapers
Newspapers published in Kuwait
Magazines established in 1965
Publications established in 1968